Cranesville may refer to:

 Cranesville, New York
 Cranesville, Pennsylvania
 Cranesville, West Virginia
 Cranesville Historic District, in Dalton, Massachusetts